Ogna is a former municipality in Rogaland county, Norway. The  municipality existed from 1839 until its dissolution in 1964.  The municipality encompassed roughly the southern third of the present-day municipality of Hå.  The administrative centre of the municipality was the village of Ogna where the Ogna Church is located.

History
The municipality of Ogna was established in 1839 when it was split off from the (much larger) municipality of Egersund landdistrikt, the rural municipality surrounding the town of Egersund. Initially, there were 825 residents of Ogna. During the 1960s, there were many major municipal changes across Norway due to the work of the Schei Committee. On 1 January 1964, the three neighboring municipalities of Nærbø, Varhaug, and Ogna were all merged into one large municipality called Hå. Prior to the merger, Ogna municipality had 1,470 residents.

Government
All municipalities in Norway, including Ogna, are responsible for primary education (through 10th grade), outpatient health services, senior citizen services, unemployment and other social services, zoning, economic development, and municipal roads.  The municipality is governed by a municipal council of elected representatives, which in turn elects a mayor.

Municipal council
The municipal council  of Ogna was made up of 15 representatives that were elected to four year terms.  The party breakdown of the final municipal council was as follows:

See also
List of former municipalities of Norway

References

Hå
Former municipalities of Norway
1839 establishments in Norway
1964 disestablishments in Norway